Su Beng (9 November 1918 – 20 September 2019), born Lin Chao-hui and later known as Shih Chao-hui, was a Taiwanese political activist of Taiwan independence movement.

Early years and exile

Su Beng was born on 9 November 1918 in Shirin Town, Taihoku Chō, Japanese Taiwan (modern-day Shilin District of Taipei). His birth name was Lin Chao-hui. Aged 11, he began using his maternal surname Shih.

After graduating from Waseda University in Tokyo with a degree in political science and economics in 1942, he left for mainland China where he worked undercover with the Chinese Communists (1942–1949). For years, he averted the Chinese Communists’ bids for him to join the party. Finally he escaped from Qingdao to Taiwan, just as the Chinese Nationalist Kuomintang soldiers were retreating to Taiwan. Having returned to Taiwan for about a year, he established the Taiwan Independence Armed Corps in 1950 which plotted for the assassination of Generalissimo Chiang Kai-shek. When the Taiwan Independence Armed Corps' stash of weapons were discovered hidden on land owned by Su Beng's grandmother in 1951, Su Beng was forced to go into hiding.

After several months on the run, he finally fled to Japan in May 1952 by stowing away in a boat exporting bananas. He served four months of detention for attempting to illegally enter the country, but when the Kuomintang reported him missing and wanted for his involvement in the plot to assassinate Chiang Kai-shek, the Japanese government granted him political asylum. Later on in 1954, Su Beng opened up a noodle shop restaurant in Ikebukuro, Japan. Su Beng used the restaurant/residence as a base to continue his work with the underground Taiwan independence movement. It was also here that he trained burgeoning independence activists and began writing Taiwan’s 400 Year History. The Japanese version of this book was first published in 1962, the Chinese-language version was published in 1980 and an abridged English version was published in 1986.

Return from exile
In 1993 Su Beng returned to reside in Taipei, Taiwan. The following year, April 1994, he began the Taiwan Independence Action motorcade, which he conceived as a way to raise the Taiwanese people’s consciousness. The motorcade makes its rounds from Taipei county to Taipei city, every Saturday and Sunday afternoon, delivering messages calling for Taiwan’s independence and the normalization of Taiwan as a country.

Labeled a radical, violent militant and communist, he was dubbed the "Che Guevara of Taiwan". Several tall tales existed about Su Beng’s controversial life decisions, one of which included electing to have a vasectomy when he was in his twenties while working undercover for the Communists in China.

Su died of pneumonia and multiple organ failure at Taipei Medical University Hospital on 20 September 2019, aged 100.

Pen name
He first used Su Beng (史明, literally "to clearly understand the history") as his pen name for Taiwanese’s 400 Year History in 1962. In choosing his pen name, he wanted to express his motivation for writing the book. Su Beng believed that once the Taiwanese people understand their unique history, they will be able to know who they are, what they want for themselves and their nation. The two characters which make up his name mean "history" and "clear", respectively. Taken together, they may be interpreted as “history clearly”, as in “to know history clearly.”

References

External links

Website About Su Beng maintained and written by his English Biographer Felicia Lin
Su Beng's personal (Chinese language) website

1918 births
2019 deaths
Taiwanese centenarians
Taiwanese exiles
20th-century Taiwanese historians
Taiwanese revolutionaries
Taiwanese people of Hoklo descent
Taiwan independence activists
Men centenarians
Waseda University alumni
Writers from Taipei
Taiwanese expatriates in Japan
Deaths from pneumonia in Taiwan
Deaths from multiple organ failure
Senior Advisors to President Tsai Ing-wen